"Yume no tame ni" is the tenth single released on June 9, 1999, by Japanese pop duo Puffy AmiYumi on the album Fever Fever.

Track listing
 Yume no tame ni
 Yume no tame ni (Original Karaoke)

Chart performance
The single peaked at number 12 and stayed on the chart for 4 weeks.

References 

Puffy AmiYumi songs
1999 singles
Songs written by Tamio Okuda
1999 songs